Sir Clement Fisher, 2nd Baronet (1613 - 15 April 1683) was an English  politician who sat in the House of Commons from 1661 to 1679. He supported the Royalist cause in the English Civil War.

Life

Fisher was the son of Sir Robert Fisher, 1st Baronet of Great Packington, Warwickshire and his wife Elizabeth Tyringham, daughter of Sir Anthony Tyringham of Tyringham, Buckinghamshire. During the Civil War with his father, he suffered for his support of the King. He succeeded to the baronetcy on the death of his father on 29 March 1647. He was fined £1,711, on 24 January 1648, which was reduced to £1,140.

In 1661, Fisher was elected Member of Parliament for Coventry in the Cavalier Parliament. He built Packington Old Hall in 1679.

Fisher died at the age of about 70 and was buried at Packington.

Family

Fisher married Jane Lane daughter of Thomas Lane, of Bentley, Staffordshire and his wife Anne Bagot, daughter of Walter Bagot, of Blithfield on 8 December 1662. She had helped  Charles II, to escape after the Battle of Worcester in September 1651, for which she was granted £1,000 a year for life after the Restoration. They had no children and he was succeeded in the baronetcy by his nephew Clement.

References

1613 births
1683 deaths
English MPs 1661–1679
Baronets in the Baronetage of England
Members of Parliament for Coventry